Stonecrest is a city in DeKalb County, Georgia, United States. The boundaries of the city generally lie in the far southeastern corner of the county, and a smaller portion just north of Interstate 20. The city borders the existing municipality of Lithonia, as well as Rockdale and Henry counties.
Residents in the area voted in the November 2016 General Election to approve the city. In March 2017, elections were held to elect representatives for five city council districts as well as mayor. Jason Lary, a former insurance executive, concert promoter, and advocate of incorporation was elected the city's first mayor. The City Council members are District 1, Jimmy Clanton, District 2 Rob Turner, District 3 Jazzmin Cobble, District 4 George Turner and District 5 Tammy Grimes.  Also the area is represented at the county level by District 5 Commissioner Mereda Davis-Johnson and Super District 7 Commissioner Lorraine Cochran- Johnson.

The area is home to the Mall at Stonecrest, for which it is named, as well as the Davidson-Arabia Nature Preserve, Flat Rock Archives, and Arabia Mountain National Heritage Area.

The city had voted a plan to deannex 345 acres of its territory so that the Georgia Legislature could create a new city, to be called Amazon, Georgia, if Stonecrest had been selected to host Amazon's new corporate headquarters, a project which would result in billions of dollars of investment and the creation of 50,000 jobs, a number equal to the estimated population of Stonecrest.

Jason Lary, the former Mayor of Stonecrest pleaded guilty in federal court to stealing COVID-19 relief funds that were supposed to go to struggling businesses. Jason Lary, whose resignation went into effect at 10 a.m. Wednesday, January 5th, 2022, pleaded guilty to three counts involving wire fraud, theft of government funds and conspiracy. Lary agreed that he diverted at least $650,000 in relief money by requiring Stonecrest churches and businesses to kick back a portion of their grant money to companies he controlled.

Demographics

2020 census

As of the 2020 United States census, there were 59,194 people, 20,325 households, and 11,759 families residing in the city. Stonecrest in 2019 had a median household income of $49,865 and a median age of 32.9 years. 18.6% of the population live in poverty. The median property value in the city was $111,400. 43.3% of the population owns homes.

Education
The DeKalb County School District is the area school district.

Elementary schools serving parts of Stonecrest and located in Stonecrest include: Murphy Candler, Fairington, Flat Rock, Panola Way, and Stoneview. Parts are also in the Redan, Princeton, and Rock Chapel elementary zones.

Middle schools serving parts of Stonecrest include Salem Middle School (in Stonecrest), Lithonia Middle School (in Lithonia), and Miller Grove Middle School (near Stonecrest).

High schools serving parts of Stonecrest include Lithonia High School (in Stonecrest), Miller Grove High School (in Stonecrest), and Martin Luther King High School (across from Stonecrest).

A magnet school, Arabia Mountain High School, is in Stonecrest.

References

External links

 City of Stonecrest

Cities in Georgia (U.S. state)
Cities in DeKalb County, Georgia
Cities in the Atlanta metropolitan area
DeKalb County, Georgia
Populated places established in 2017
2017 establishments in Georgia (U.S. state)
Stonecrest, Georgia